"Leave Virginia Alone" is a song written by American musician Tom Petty and performed by British rock and pop singer and songwriter Rod Stewart on Stewart's seventeenth album, A Spanner in the Works (1995). The song reached number one on the Canadian RPM Top Singles and Adult Contemporary charts in 1995. It also reached number 52 on the US Billboard Hot 100 and number 53 in Australia. It was later included on Petty's album Wildflowers and All the Rest (2020).

Background
"Leave Virginia Alone" was originally meant to be on Tom Petty's studio album Wildflowers, but the track did not make the album. In a Billboard interview with Rod Stewart, Stewart revealed that Petty's manager gave him the song when Petty believed the track was too similar to a previous hit of his. "Leave Virginia Alone" was added to Stewart's album A Spanner in the Works after the audio mastering was finished and was the first single for the album.

Release
On 13 May 1995, Stewart debuted "Leave Virginia Alone" on Saturday Night Lives twentieth-season finale.

Reception
"Leave Virginia Alone" received positive reviews from critics. Steve Baltin from Cash Box declared it as "a can’t miss" and "a guaranteed
smash". He added, "In addition, though, it’s a wonderfully catchy tune that features Stewart’s trademark vocals sounding as strong as they have in years." Matthew Bolin of Popdose said it was a "solid song with a fitting vocal performance". Larry Flick from Billboard complimented the connection between Rod Stewart's voice with the beats and acoustic guitars of the track. All the same, Stewart admitted to Billboard that at first, he did not like the song and had to be convinced to record the track.

Music video
In the accompanying music video for "Leave Virginia Alone", a woman runs away from people wearing costumes after holding a press conference. In an article in the Chicago Tribune, Susan Alexander said "Leave Virginia Alone" fit the music video format of having a "bad girl" who uses emotional manipulation. A few years later in Michigan Sociological Review, Alexander said she believed the woman in the video committed a sinful act, and the lyrics of "Leave Virginia Alone" point towards drug abuse and promiscuity.

Charts

Weekly charts

Year end charts

Tom Petty version

"Leave Virginia Alone", this time sung by the writer Tom Petty, would later appear on the track list for the posthumous album released by his estate, Wildflowers & All the Rest. The song was released as a single from the album on October 1, 2020.

See also
 List of number-one singles of 1995 (Canada)

References

1995 singles
1995 songs
Rod Stewart songs
RPM Top Singles number-one singles
Songs written by Tom Petty
Tom Petty songs